Bloody Mary is a legend of a ghost, phantom, or spirit conjured to reveal the future. She is said to appear in a mirror when her name is chanted repeatedly. The Bloody Mary apparition may be benign or malevolent, depending on historic variations of the legend. Bloody Mary appearances are mostly witnessed in group participation play.

Ritual
Historically, the divination ritual encouraged young women to walk up a flight of stairs backward holding a candle and a hand mirror, in a darkened house. As they gazed into the mirror, they were supposed to be able to catch a view of their future husband's face. There was, however, a chance that they would see a skull (or the face of the Grim Reaper) instead, indicating that they were going to die before they would have the chance to marry.

In the ritual of today, Bloody Mary allegedly appears to individuals or groups who ritualistically invoke her name in an act of catoptromancy. This is done by repeatedly chanting her name into a mirror placed in a dimly-lit or candle-lit room. The name must be uttered thirteen times (or some other specified number of times). The Bloody Mary apparition allegedly appears as a corpse, witch, or ghost that can be friendly or evil, and is sometimes seen covered in blood (hence the name). The lore surrounding the ritual states that participants may endure the apparition screaming at them, cursing them, strangling them, stealing their soul, drinking their blood, or scratching their eyes out. Some variations of the ritual call Bloody Mary by a different name—"Hell Mary" and "Mary Worth" are popular examples. The modern legend of Hanako-san in Japan strongly parallels the Bloody Mary mythology.

Phenomenon explanations

Staring into a mirror in a dimly-lit room for a prolonged period can cause one to hallucinate. Facial features may appear to "melt", distort, disappear, and rotate, while other hallucinatory elements, such as animal or strange faces, may appear. Giovanni Caputo of the University of Urbino writes that this phenomenon, which he calls the "strange-face illusion", is believed to be a consequence of a "dissociative identity effect", which causes the brain's facial-recognition system to misfire in a currently unidentified way. Other possible explanations for the phenomenon include illusions attributed, at least partially, to the perceptual effects of Troxler's fading and possibly apophenia. or even self-hypnosis.

Identification
There is some debate on the identification of Bloody Mary and if she is based on a real woman. A number of historical figures have been put forward as candidates for 'Mary' including Mary I of England (daughter of Henry VIII and Catherine of Aragon), who had around 300 religious Protestant dissenters burned at the stake during her reign, earning her the nickname 'Bloody Mary'; Elizabeth Báthory, a 17th-century Hungarian countess who allegedly tortured and killed around 660 girls and women, bathed in their blood, and was accused of vampirism; and Mary Worth, who has been identified as either a woman who killed slaves escaping the American South via the Underground Railroad or a woman who was burned at the stake during the Witch trials in the early modern period.

See also
 Bloody Mary folklore in popular culture
 List of ghosts

References

External links
 Optical Illusions: Troxler's Fading

Children's street culture
Demons
Divination
Female legendary creatures
Ghosts
Supernatural legends
Urban legends
Witches in folklore